Kaman (Geman, Geman Deng, Kùmán, Kman), or Miju (Miju Mishmi, Midzu), is a small language of India and China.
Long assumed to be a Sino-Tibetan language, it may be a language isolate.

Locations
In China, the Miju are known as the Deng 僜人. The Deng number over 1,000 in Zayü County, Tibet, China, with 1,000 of the Deng having the autonym  (大让), and 130 having the autonym  (格曼) (Geman).

In India, Miju is spoken in Hawai Circle and the Parsuram Kund area of Lohit District, Arunachal Pradesh (Boro 1978, Dasgupta 1977). Ethnologue reports that Miju is spoken in 25 villages located in high altitude areas to the east of upper Lohit and Dau valleys, which are located east of the Haguliang, Billong, and Tilai valleys.

Phonology
These are the sounds in the Miju/Kaman language.

Consonants

Vowels

/ɯ/ may also be heard as [ɨ].

Tones
There are three main tones in the Miju language, rising (á), falling (à), and level (ā).

Registers
Kman has various registers that are used in different situations. These include:

shamanic
hunting
cursing and scolding
poetic

References

Further reading
Blench, Roger. 2019. A grammar of Kman [=Miju], a language of Arunachal Pradesh
Blench, Roger. 2017. A dictionary of Kman (Miju), a language of Arunachal Pradesh.
Blench, Roger. 2015. Reading and writing Kman / Kman tasay tapuri pit. Tezu, Arunachal Pradesh: Kman Language Development Committee.

Miju languages
Mishmi languages
Languages of India
Tonal languages
Languages of Arunachal Pradesh
Language isolates of Asia